The 8th Army was a field army of the Royal Italian Army, which fought in World War I and on the Eastern Front during World War II.

World War I
After the disastrous defeat at Caporetto (November 1917) the Italian Army was completely reorganized by Armando Diaz and the new 8th Italian Army was formed under command of Enrico Caviglia. It consisted of : 
 4th Army corps
 the assault corps of General Francesco Saverio Grazioli.
It participated in the successful Battle of the Piave River (June 1918) and Battle of Vittorio Veneto (October-november 1918).

World War II
In February 1940, the 8th Army was formed and based in Northern Italy. It was disbanded on 31 October 1940.
It was recreated in July 1942, when the Italian Expeditionary Corps in Russia was expanded by Mussolini and named  Armata Italiana in Russia (ARMIR). 
For further details see : 
 Italian Army in Russia
 Italian participation on the Eastern Front

Commanders  
 General Adalberto, Duke of Bergamo (1940 - 1940)  
 General Italo Gariboldi (1942-1943).

References

Field armies of Italy in World War I
Field armies of Italy in World War II